The Fortunes and Misfortunes of Moll Flanders, commonly abbreviated as Moll Flanders, is a novel written by Daniel Defoe in 1722.

Moll Flanders may also refer to:

Film
 The Amorous Adventures of Moll Flanders (1965), a British film directed by Terence Young
 Moll Flanders (1996 film), starring Robin Wright and Morgan Freeman

Television
 Moll Flanders (TV series), a 1975 British television series directed by Donald McWhinnie
 The Fortunes and Misfortunes of Moll Flanders, a 1996 British series starring Alex Kingston

See also
 Mol, Belgium, a town in the region of Flanders